Markku Kumpulampi (born 21 May 1939) is a Finnish footballer. He played in 16 matches for the Finland national football team from 1957 to 1966. He played for Valkeakosken Haka, Upon Pallo and Lahden Reipas. In his 13 seasons he played 217 games and scored 83 goals in Mestaruussarja. He also played two seasons in Suomensarja where he scored 18 goals.

References

1939 births
Living people
Finnish footballers
Finland international footballers
Place of birth missing (living people)
Association football midfielders
FC Haka players
FC Kuusysi players
Reipas Lahti players